Mut is a town and district of Mersin Province in the Mediterranean region of Turkey.

Mut is a rural district at the foot of the Sertavul Pass on the road over the Taurus Mountains from Ankara and Konya to the Mediterranean coast at Anamur or Silifke. Mut is known for its special apricot variety, Mut şekerparesi, and a statue of a girl carrying a basket of them stands at the entrance to the town. The summer is hot and the people of Mut retreat to high meadows (so called yayla) even further up the mountainside. The forests up here are home to wild boar, and the Gezende reservoir on the Ermenek River is a welcome patch of blue in this dry district. The dam has a hydro-electric power station built in Romania.

History
The area has probably been inhabited since the time of the Hittites (2000 BC), and was later part of ancient Cilicia. Under the Roman Empire, the town was called Claudiopolis.

The Romans were succeeded by the Kingdom of Armenia. In the 13th century the Armenians were replaced by the Karamanid clan who founded the state of the same name. The mosque of Lal Pasha, and the Red Minaret (Kızılminare) are among the buildings from the Karamanids that still stand in Mut today.

Economy 
Small cattle breeding is one of the important livelihoods of the region.

Notable natives
 Durmuş Yalçın (Politician)
 Karacaoğlan (Poet) 
 Musa Eroğlu (Musician) 
 Hüseyin Gezer (Sculptor)
 Seyhan Kurt (Poet, writer) 
 Fikri Sağlar (Politician)

Well-known residents
 Mut is one of the places in the area that claims to be the burial place of the folk poet Karacaoğlan.
 The folk musician (bağlama player) Musa Eroğlu was born in Mut. 
The Anatolian leopard was last sighted near Mut, in the locality called "Dandi" in 2001.

References

External links

 District municipality's official website 

Populated places in Mersin Province
Districts of Mersin Province
Mut District
Towns in Turkey